The 30th United States Congress was a meeting of the legislative branch of the United States federal government, consisting of the United States Senate and the United States House of Representatives. It met in Washington, D.C. from March 4, 1847, to March 4, 1849, during the last two years of the administration of President James K. Polk. The apportionment of seats in the House of Representatives was based on the 1840 United States census. The Senate had a Democratic majority, and the House had a Whig majority. It was the only Congress in which Abraham Lincoln served.

Major events 

 July 1, 1847: United States issued its first postage stamps
 January 24, 1848: Gold found at Sutter's Mill, beginning the California Gold Rush
 January 31, 1848: Washington Monument established
 February 23, 1848: Former President John Quincy Adams, now a Congressman representing Massachusetts, dies in the Speaker's office after suffering a stroke in the House Chambers.
 July 19, 1848: Seneca Falls Convention
 November 7, 1848: U.S. presidential election, 1848: Whig Zachary Taylor defeated Lewis Cass in the first US presidential election held in every state on the same day.
 1846–1848: Mexican–American War

Major legislation 

 March 3, 1849: United States Department of the Interior established, sess. 2, ch. 108, 
 March 3, 1849: Gold Coinage Act, sess. 2, ch. 109,

Treaty 

 February 2, 1848: Treaty of Guadalupe Hidalgo signed, ending the Mexican–American War and ceding to the United States virtually all of what is today the southwest United States.

States admitted and territories established 
 May 29, 1848: Wisconsin admitted as the 30th U.S. state, sess. 1, ch. 50, 
 August 14, 1848: Oregon Territory was formed from territory ceded by Great Britain, sess. 1, ch. 177, 
 March 3, 1849: Minnesota Territory formed from the Wisconsin Territory, sess. 2, ch. 121,

Party summary

Senate 
During this congress, two Senate seats were added for the new state of Wisconsin.

House of Representatives
During this congress, two House seats were added for the new state of Wisconsin.

Leadership

Senate 
 President: George M. Dallas (D)
 President pro tempore: David R. Atchison (D)

House of Representatives 
 Speaker: Robert C. Winthrop (W)

Members 
This list is arranged by chamber, then by state. Senators are listed by class and representatives are listed by district.
Skip to House of Representatives, below

Senate

Alabama 
 2. Dixon H. Lewis (D), until October 25, 1848
 Benjamin Fitzpatrick (D), from November 25, 1848
 3. Arthur P. Bagby (D), until June 16, 1848
 William R. D. King (D), from July 1, 1848

Arkansas 
 2. Chester Ashley (D), until April 29, 1848
 William K. Sebastian (D), from May 12, 1848
 3. Ambrose H. Sevier (D), until March 15, 1848
 Solon Borland (D), from March 30, 1848

Connecticut 
 1. Jabez W. Huntington (W), until November 1, 1847
 Roger S. Baldwin (W), from November 11, 1847
 3. John M. Niles (D)

Delaware 
 1. John M. Clayton (W), until February 23, 1849
 John Wales (W), from February 23, 1849
 2. Presley Spruance (W)

Florida 
 1. David Levy Yulee (D)
 3. James D. Westcott Jr. (D)

Georgia 
 2. John Macpherson Berrien (W)
 3. Walter T. Colquitt (D), until February 4, 1848
 Herschel V. Johnson (D), from February 4, 1848

Illinois 
 2. Stephen A. Douglas (D)
 3. Sidney Breese (D)

Indiana 
 1. Jesse D. Bright (D)
 3. Edward A. Hannegan (D)

Iowa 
 2. George Wallace Jones (D), from December 7, 1848
 3. Augustus C. Dodge (D), from December 7, 1848

Kentucky 
 2. Joseph R. Underwood (W)
 3. John J. Crittenden (W), until June 12, 1848
 Thomas Metcalfe (W), from June 23, 1848

Louisiana 
 2. Solomon W. Downs (D)
 3. Henry Johnson (W)

Maine 
 1. John Fairfield (D), until December 24, 1847
 Wyman B. S. Moor (D), January 5, 1848 – June 7, 1848
 Hannibal Hamlin (D), from June 7, 1848
 2. James W. Bradbury (D)

Maryland 
 1. Reverdy Johnson (W)
 3. James Pearce (W)

Massachusetts 
 1. Daniel Webster (W)
 2. John Davis (W)

Michigan 
 1. Lewis Cass (D), until May 29, 1848
 Thomas Fitzgerald (D), from June 8, 1848
 2. Alpheus Felch (D)

Mississippi 
 1. Jesse Speight (D), until May 1, 1847
 Jefferson Davis (D), from August 10, 1847
 2. Henry S. Foote (D)

Missouri 
 1. Thomas H. Benton (D)
 3. David R. Atchison (D)

New Hampshire 
 2. John P. Hale (ID)
 3. Charles G. Atherton (D)

New Jersey 
 1. William L. Dayton (W)
 2. Jacob W. Miller (W)

New York 
 1. Daniel S. Dickinson (D)
 3. John A. Dix (D)

North Carolina 
 2. Willie P. Mangum (W)
 3. George E. Badger (W)

Ohio 
 1. Thomas Corwin (W)
 3. William Allen (D)

Pennsylvania 
 1. Daniel Sturgeon (D)
 3. Simon Cameron (D)

Rhode Island 
 1. Albert C. Greene (W)
 2. John H. Clarke (W)

South Carolina 
 2. John C. Calhoun (D)
 3. Andrew Butler (D)

Tennessee 
 1. Hopkins L. Turney (D)
 2. John Bell (W), from November 22, 1847

Texas 
 1. Thomas J. Rusk (D)
 2. Samuel Houston (D)

Vermont 
 1. Samuel S. Phelps (W)
 3. William Upham (W)

Virginia 
 1. James M. Mason (D)
 2. Robert M. T. Hunter (D)

Wisconsin 
 1. Henry Dodge (D), from June 8, 1848 (newly admitted state)
 3. Isaac P. Walker (D), from June 8, 1848 (newly admitted state)

House of Representatives 
The names of members of the House of Representatives are preceded by their district numbers.

Alabama 
 . John Gayle (W)
 . Henry W. Hilliard (W)
 . Sampson W. Harris (D)
 . Samuel W. Inge (D)
 . George S. Houston (D)
 . Williamson R. W. Cobb (D)
 . Franklin W. Bowdon (D)

Arkansas 
 . Robert W. Johnson (D)

Connecticut 
 . James Dixon (W)
 . Samuel D. Hubbard (W)
 . John A. Rockwell (W)
 . Truman Smith (W)

Delaware 
 . John W. Houston (W)

Florida 
 . Edward C. Cabell (W)

Georgia 
 . Thomas Butler King (W)
 . Alfred Iverson Sr. (D)
 . John W. Jones (W)
 . Hugh A. Haralson (D)
 . John H. Lumpkin (D)
 . Howell Cobb (D)
 . Alexander H. Stephens (W)
 . Robert A. Toombs (W)

Illinois 
 . Robert Smith (ID)
 . John A. McClernand (D)
 . Orlando B. Ficklin (D)
 . John Wentworth (D)
 . William A. Richardson (D), from December 6, 1847
 . Thomas J. Turner (D)
 . Abraham Lincoln (W)

Indiana 
 . Elisha Embree (W)
 . Thomas J. Henley (D)
 . John L. Robinson (D)
 . Caleb B. Smith (W)
 . William W. Wick (D)
 . George G. Dunn (W)
 . Richard W. Thompson (W)
 . John Pettit (D)
 . Charles W. Cathcart (D)
 . William R. Rockhill (D)

Iowa 
 . William Thompson (D)
 . Shepherd Leffler (D)

Kentucky 
 . Linn Boyd (D)
 . Beverly L. Clarke (D)
 . Samuel O. Peyton (D)
 . Aylette Buckner (W)
 . John B. Thompson (W)
 . Green Adams (W)
 . W. Garnett Duncan (W)
 . Charles S. Morehead (W)
 . Richard French (D)
 . John P. Gaines (W)

Louisiana 
 . Emile La Sére (D)
 . Bannon G. Thibodeaux (W)
 . John H. Harmanson (D)
 . Isaac E. Morse (D)

Maine 
 . David Hammons (D)
 . Asa W. H. Clapp (D)
 . Hiram Belcher (W)
 . Franklin Clark (D)
 . Ephraim K. Smart (D)
 . James S. Wiley (D)
 . Hezekiah Williams (D)

Maryland 
 . John G. Chapman (W)
 . J. Dixon Roman (W)
 . Thomas W. Ligon (D)
 . Robert M. McLane (D)
 . Alexander Evans (W)
 . John W. Crisfield (W)

Massachusetts 
 . Robert C. Winthrop (W)
 . Daniel P. King (W)
 . Amos Abbott (W)
 . John G. Palfrey (W)
 . Charles Hudson (W)
 . George Ashmun (W)
 . Julius Rockwell (W)
 . John Quincy Adams (W), until February 23, 1848
 Horace Mann (W), from April 3, 1848
 . Artemas Hale (W)
 . Joseph Grinnell (W)

Michigan 
 . Robert McClelland (D)
 . Edward Bradley (D), until August 5, 1847
 Charles E. Stuart (D), from December 6, 1847
 . Kinsley S. Bingham (D)

Mississippi 
 . Jacob Thompson (D)
 . Winfield S. Featherston (D)
 . Patrick W. Tompkins (W)
 . Albert G. Brown (D)

Missouri 
 . James B. Bowlin (D)
 . John Jameson (D)
 . James S. Green (D)
 . Willard P. Hall (D)
 . John S. Phelps (D)

New Hampshire 
 . Amos Tuck (I)
 . Charles H. Peaslee (D)
 . James Wilson (W)
 . James H. Johnson (D)

New Jersey 
 . James G. Hampton (W)
 . William A. Newell (W)
 . Joseph E. Edsall (D)
 . John Van Dyke (W)
 . Dudley S. Gregory (W)

New York 
 . Frederick W. Lord (D)
 . Henry C. Murphy (D)
 . Henry Nicoll (D)
 . William B. Maclay (D)
 . Frederick A. Tallmadge (W)
 . David S. Jackson (D), until April 19, 1848
 Horace Greeley (W), from December 4, 1848
 . William Nelson (W)
 . Cornelius Warren (W)
 . Daniel B. St. John (W)
 . Eliakim Sherrill (W)
 . Peter H. Silvester (W)
 . Gideon Reynolds (W)
 . John I. Slingerland (W)
 . Orlando Kellogg (W)
 . Sidney Lawrence (D)
 . Hugh White (W)
 . George Petrie (ID)
 . William Collins (D)
 . Joseph Mullin (W)
 . Timothy Jenkins (D)
 . George A. Starkweather (D)
 . Ausburn Birdsall (D)
 . William Duer (W)
 . Daniel Gott (W)
 . Harmon S. Conger (W)
 . William T. Lawrence (W)
 . John M. Holley (W), until March 8, 1848
 Esbon Blackmar (W), from December 4, 1848
 . Elias B. Holmes (W)
 . Robert L. Rose (W)
 . David Rumsey Jr. (W)
 . Dudley Marvin (W)
 . Nathan K. Hall (W)
 . Harvey Putnam (W)
 . Washington Hunt (W)

North Carolina 
 . Thomas L. Clingman (W)
 . Nathaniel Boyden (W)
 . Daniel M. Barringer (W)
 . Augustine H. Shepperd (W)
 . Abraham W. Venable (D)
 . John R. J. Daniel (D)
 . James I. McKay (D)
 . Richard S. Donnell (W)
 . David Outlaw (W)

Ohio 
 . James J. Faran (D)
 . David Fisher (W)
 . Robert C. Schenck (W)
 . Richard S. Canby (W)
 . William Sawyer (D)
 . Rodolphus Dickinson (D)
 . Jonathan D. Morris (D)
 . John L. Taylor (W)
 . Thomas O. Edwards (W)
 . Daniel Duncan (W)
 . John K. Miller (D)
 . Samuel F. Vinton (W)
 . Thomas Ritchey (D)
 . Nathan Evans (W)
 . William Kennon Jr. (D)
 . John D. Cummins (D)
 . George Fries (D)
 . Samuel Lahm (D)
 . John Crowell (W)
 . Joshua R. Giddings (W)
 . Joseph M. Root (W)

Pennsylvania 
 . Lewis C. Levin (A)
 . Joseph R. Ingersoll (W)
 . Charles Brown (D)
 . Charles J. Ingersoll (D)
 . John Freedley (W)
 . John W. Hornbeck (W), until January 16, 1848
 Samuel A. Bridges (D), from March 6, 1848
 . Abraham R. McIlvaine (W)
 . John Strohm (W)
 . William Strong (D)
 . Richard Brodhead (D)
 . Chester P. Butler (W)
 . David Wilmot (D)
 . James Pollock (W)
 . George N. Eckert (W)
 . Henry Nes (W)
 . Jasper E. Brady (W)
 . John Blanchard (W)
 . Andrew Stewart (W)
 . Job Mann (D)
 . John Dickey (W)
 . Moses Hampton (W)
 . John W. Farrelly (W)
 . James Thompson (D)
 . Alexander Irvin (W)

Rhode Island 
 . Robert B. Cranston (W)
 . Benjamin B. Thurston (D)

South Carolina 
 . James A. Black (D), until April 3, 1848
 Daniel Wallace (D), from June 12, 1848
 . Richard F. Simpson (D)
 . Joseph A. Woodward (D)
 . Alexander D. Sims (D), until November 22, 1848
 John McQueen (D), from February 12, 1849
 . Armistead Burt (D)
 . Isaac E. Holmes (D)
 . Robert Rhett (D)

Tennessee 
 . Andrew Johnson (D)
 . William M. Cocke (W)
 . John H. Crozier (W)
 . Hugh L. W. Hill (D)
 . George W. Jones (D)
 . James H. Thomas (D)
 . Meredith P. Gentry (W)
 . Washington Barrow (W)
 . Lucien B. Chase (D)
 . Frederick P. Stanton (D)
 . William T. Haskell (W)

Texas 
 . David S. Kaufman (D)
 . Timothy Pilsbury (D)

Vermont 
 . William Henry (W)
 . Jacob Collamer (W)
 . George P. Marsh (W)
 . Lucius B. Peck (D)

Virginia 
 . Archibald Atkinson (D)
 . George Dromgoole (D), until April 27, 1847
 Richard K. Meade (D), from August 5, 1847
 . Thomas S. Flournoy (W)
 . Thomas S. Bocock (D)
 . William L. Goggin (W)
 . John M. Botts (W)
 . Thomas H. Bayly (D)
 . Richard L. T. Beale (D)
 . John S. Pendleton (W)
 . Henry Bedinger (D)
 . James McDowell (D)
 . William B. Preston (W)
 . Andrew S. Fulton (W)
 . Robert A. Thompson (D)
 . William G. Brown Sr. (D)

Wisconsin 
 . William P. Lynde (D), from June 8, 1848 (newly admitted state)
 . Mason C. Darling (D), from June 8, 1848 (newly admitted state)

Non-voting members 
 . John H. Tweedy (W), until May 29, 1848
 Henry H. Sibley, from October 30, 1848

Changes in membership 
The count below reflects changes from the beginning of the first session of this Congress.

Senate 
 Replacements: 11
 Democrats (D): 4 seat net gain
 Whigs (W): no net change
 Deaths: 5
 Resignations: 6
 Interim appointments: 7
 Seats of newly admitted states: 4

|-
| Tennessee(2)
| Vacant
| Failure to elect.Successor elected November 22, 1847.
|  | John Bell (W)
| Elected November 22, 1847.

|-
| Iowa(2)
| Vacant
| Iowa had been admitted to the Union December 28, 1846, but the legislature failed to elect due to a three-way split that prevented any candidate from earning the required number of 30 legislators' votes.First Senator elected December 7, 1848.
|  | George Wallace Jones (D)
| Elected December 7, 1848.

|-
| Iowa(3)
| Vacant
| Iowa had been admitted to the Union December 28, 1846, but the legislature failed to elect due to a three-way split that prevented any candidate from earning the required number of 30 legislators' votes.First Senator elected December 7, 1848.
|  | Augustus C. Dodge (D)
| Elected December 7, 1848.

|-
| Mississippi(1)
|  | Jesse Speight (D)
| Incumbent died May 1, 1847.Successor appointed August 10, 1847, and then elected January 1848.
|  | Jefferson Davis (D)
| Appointed December 5, 1847.

|-
| Connecticut(1)
|  | Jabez W. Huntington (W)
| Incumbent died November 1, 1847.Successor appointed November 11, 1847, and then elected May 1848.
|  | Roger S. Baldwin (W)
| Appointed December 5, 1847.

|-
| Maine(1)
|  | John Fairfield (D)
| Incumbent died December 24, 1847.Successor appointed January 5, 1848.
|  | Wyman B. S. Moor (D)
| Appointed January 5, 1848.

|-
| Georgia(3)
|  | Walter T. Colquitt (D)
| Incumbent resigned February 4, 1848.Successor appointed February 4, 1848, to finish the term.
|  | Herschel V. Johnson (D)
| Appointed February 4, 1848.

|-
| Arkansas(3)
|  | Ambrose H. Sevier (D)
| Incumbent resigned March 15, 1848.Successor appointed March 30, 1848, to finish the term.
|  | Solon Borland (D)
| Appointed March 30, 1848.

|-
| Arkansas(2)
|  | Chester Ashley (D)
| Incumbent died April 29, 1848.Successor appointed May 12, 1848, and elected sometime thereafter.
|  | William K. Sebastian (D)
| Elected May 12, 1848.

|-
| Wisconsin(1)
| colspan=2 | Wisconsin admitted to the Union May 29, 1848.First Senator elected June 8, 1848.
|  | Henry Dodge (D)
| Elected June 8, 1848.

|-
| Wisconsin(3)
| colspan=2 | Wisconsin admitted to the Union May 29, 1848.First Senator elected June 8, 1848.
|  | Isaac P. Walker (D)
| Elected June 8, 1848.

|-
| Michigan(1)
|  | Lewis Cass (D)
| Incumbent resigned May 29, 1848, to run for U.S. President.Successor appointed June 8, 1848.
|  | Thomas Fitzgerald (D)
| Elected June 8, 1848.

|-
| Maine(1)
|  | Wyman B. S. Moor (D)
| Interim appointee retired when successor elected June 7, 1848.
|  | Hannibal Hamlin (D)
| Elected June 7, 1848.

|-
| Kentucky(3)
|  | John J. Crittenden (W)
| Incumbent resigned June 12, 1848, to run for Governor of Kentucky.Successor appointed June 23, 1848, and elected sometime thereafter.
|  | Thomas Metcalfe (W)
| Elected June 23, 1848.

|-
| Alabama(3)
|  | Arthur P. Bagby (D)
| Incumbent resigned June 16, 1848, to become U.S. Minister to Russia.Successor elected July 1, 1848.
|  | William R. King (D)
| Elected July 1, 1848.

|-
| Alabama(2)
|  | Dixon H. Lewis (D)
| Incumbent died October 25, 1848.Successor elected November 25, 1848.
|  | Benjamin Fitzpatrick (D)
| Elected November 25, 1848.

|-
| Delaware(1)
|  | John M. Clayton (W)
| Incumbent resigned February 23, 1849, to become U.S. Secretary of State.Successor elected February 23, 1849.
|  | John Wales (W)
| Elected February 23, 1849.
|}

House of Representatives 
 Replacements: 10
 Democrats (D): no net change
 Whigs (W): no net change
 Deaths: 7
 Resignations: 0
 Contested election: 1
 Seats of newly admitted states: 2
Total seats with changes: 12

|-
| 
| Vacant
| Representative Stephen A. Douglas resigned at end of previous congress.
|  | William A. Richardson (D)
| Seated December 6, 1847

|-
| 
|  | George Dromgoole (D)
| Incumbent died April 27, 1847.
|  | Richard K. Meade (D)
| Seated August 5, 1847

|-
| 
|  | Edward Bradley (D)
| Incumbent died August 5, 1847.
|  | Charles E. Stuart (D)
| Seated December 6, 1847

|-
| 
|  | John W. Hornbeck (W)
| Incumbent died January 16, 1848.
|  | Samuel A. Bridges (D)
| Seated March 6, 1848

|-
| 
|  | John Quincy Adams (W)
| Incumbent died February 23, 1848.
|  | Horace Mann (W)
| Seated April 3, 1848

|-
| 
|  | John M. Holley (W)
| Incumbent died March 8, 1848.
|  | Esbon Blackmar (W)
| Seated December 4, 1848

|-
| 
|  | James A. Black (D)
| Incumbent died April 3, 1848.
|  | Daniel Wallace (D)
| Seated June 12, 1848

|-
| 
|  | David S. Jackson (D)
| James Monroe contested seat after which the House declared the seat vacant April 19, 1848.
|  | Horace Greeley (W)
| Seated December 4, 1848

|-
| 
| colspan=2 | Wisconsin admitted into the Union May 29, 1848, and seat remained vacant until June 8, 1848.
|  | William P. Lynde (D)
| Seated June 8, 1848

|-
| 
| colspan=2 | Wisconsin admitted into the Union May 29, 1848, and seat remained vacant until June 8, 1848.
|  | Mason C. Darling (D)
| Seated June 8, 1848

|-
| 
|  | John H. Tweedy (W)
| Incumbent was disqualified May 29, 1848, after the portion of territory he resided in achieved statehood.
| Henry H. Sibley
| Seated October 30, 1848

|-
| 
|  | Alexander D. Sims (D)
| Incumbent died November 22, 1848.
|  | John McQueen (D)
| Seated February 12, 1849

|}

Committees
Lists of committees and their party leaders.

Senate

 Agriculture (Chairman: Daniel Sturgeon)
 Audit and Control the Contingent Expenses of the Senate (Chairman: Alpheus Felch then Isaac P. Walker)
 Claims (Chairman: Moses Norris Jr.)
 Commerce (Chairman: John Adams Dix)
 Distributing Public Revenue Among the States (Select)
 District of Columbia (Chairman: Herschel V. Johnson)
 Expedition of John C. Fremont (Select)
 Enrolled Bills (Chairman: Thomas J. Rusk) 
 Finance (Chairman: Charles G. Atherton)
 Foreign Relations (Chairman: Ambrose H. Sevier then Edward A. Hannegan then Thomas Hart Benton)
 Indian Affairs (Chairman: David R. Atchison)
 Judiciary (Chairman: Andrew P. Butler) 
 Library (Chairman: James A. Pearce) 
 Manufactures (Chairman: Daniel S. Dickinson)
 Memorial of Certain Cherokee Claimants (Select)
 Military Affairs (Chairman: Lewis Cass then Thomas Hart Benton)
 Militia (Chairman: Thomas J. Rusk)
 Monuments to Deceased Senators (Select)
 Naval Affairs (Chairman: David Levy Yulee)
 Oregon Railroad (Select)
 Ordnance and War Ships (Select)
 Patents and the Patent Office (Chairman: James D. Westcott)
 Pensions (Chairman: Henry Johnson)
 Post Office and Post Roads (Chairman: John M. Niles)
 Printing (Chairman: Simon Cameron)
 Private Land Claims (Chairman: Solomon W. Downs) 
 Public Buildings and Grounds (Chairman: Robert M.T. Hunter)
 Public Lands (Chairman: Sidney Breese then Alpheus Felch)
 Retired List for the Army and the Navy (Select)
 Retrenchment (Chairman: Hopkins L. Turney) 
 Seventh Census (Select)
 Revolutionary Claims (Chairman: Jesse D. Bright)
 Rivers and Harbors Convention in Chicago (Select)
 Roads and Canals (Chairman: Edward A. Hannegan)
 Tariff Bill of 1828 (Special)
 Tariff Regulation (Select)
 Territories (Chairman: Stephen A. Douglas)
 Whole

House of Representatives

 Accounts (Chairman: Daniel P. King)
 Agriculture (Chairman: Hugh White)
 Claims (Chairman: Joseph R. Ingersoll)
 Commerce (Chairman: Washington Hunt)
 District of Columbia (Chairman: John G. Chapman)
 Elections (Chairman: Richard W. Thompson)
 Engraving (Chairman: Lewis Charles Levin)
 Enrolled Bills (Chairman: James G. Hampton)
 Expenditures in the Navy Department (Chairman: Patrick W. Tompkins)
 Expenditures in the Post Office Department (Chairman: James Wilson)
 Expenditures in the State Department (Chairman: Daniel M. Barringer)
 Expenditures in the Treasury Department (Chairman: Joseph M. Root)
 Expenditures in the War Department (Chairman: John H. Crozier)
 Expenditures on Public Buildings (Chairman: Edward Carrington Cabell)
 Foreign Affairs (Chairman: John A. McClernand)
 Indian Affairs (Chairman: Daniel M. Barringer)
 Invalid Pensions (Chairman: Andrew S. Fulton)
 Judiciary (Chairman: Joseph R. Ingersoll)
 Manufactures (Chairman: Andrew Stewart)
 Mileage (Chairman: Hiram Belcher)
 Military Affairs (Chairman: John M. Botts)
 Militia (Chairman: John B. Thompson)
 Naval Affairs (Chairman: Thomas Butler King)
 Patents (Chairman: John W. Farrelly)
 Printing (Chairman: Harmon S. Conger)
 Private Land Claims (Chairman: John Gayle)
 Post Office and Post Roads (Chairman: William L. Goggin)
 Public Buildings and Grounds (Chairman: John W. Houston)
 Public Expenditures (Chairman: Thomas L. Clingman)
 Public Lands (Chairman: Jacob Collamer)
 Revisal and Unfinished Business (Chairman: Henry Nes)
 Revolutionary Claims (Chairman: Daniel P. King)
 Revolutionary Pensions (Chairman: William M. Cocke)
 Roads and Canals (Chairman: Robert C. Schenck)
 Rules (Select)
 Standards of Official Conduct
 Territories (Chairman: Caleb B. Smith)
 Ways and Means (Chairman: Samuel F. Vinton)
 Whole

Joint committees

 Enrolled Bills
 The Library 
 Printing

Employees 
 Librarian of Congress: John Silva Meehan

Senate 
 Chaplain: Henry Slicer (Methodist)
 Secretary: Asbury Dickins
 Sergeant at Arms: Robert Beale

House of Representatives 
 Chaplain: William T.S. Sprole (Presbyterian), until December 6, 1847
 Ralph Gurley (Presbyterian), elected December 6, 1847
 Clerk: Benjamin B. French, until December 8, 1847
 Thomas J. Campbell, elected December 8, 1847
 Doorkeeper: Robert E. Horner, elected December 8, 1847
 Postmaster: John M. Johnson
 Reading Clerks: 
 Sergeant at Arms: Newton Lane, until December 8, 1847
 Nathan Sergeant, elected December 8, 1847

See also 
 1846 United States elections (elections leading to this Congress)
 1846–47 United States Senate elections
 1846–47 United States House of Representatives elections
 1848 United States elections (elections during this Congress, leading to the next Congress)
 1848 United States presidential election
 1848–49 United States Senate elections
 1848–49 United States House of Representatives elections

Notes

References

External links 
 Statutes at Large, 1789–1875
 Senate Journal, First Forty-three Sessions of Congress
 House Journal, First Forty-three Sessions of Congress
 Biographical Directory of the U.S. Congress
 U.S. House of Representatives: House History
 U.S. Senate: Statistics and Lists